Alexander Gurov is a Ukrainian professional boxer and former WBO Asia-Pacific cruiserweight champion. He formerly held the EBU cruiserweight boxing title.

Gurov was defeated in December 2005 by David Haye losing the EBU European title in just 45 seconds.

Professional boxing record

|-
|align="center" colspan=8|42 Wins (36 knockouts, 6 decisions), 6 Losses (5 knockouts, 1 decision), 1 Draw 
|-
| align="center" style="border-style: none none solid solid; background: #e3e3e3"|Result
| align="center" style="border-style: none none solid solid; background: #e3e3e3"|Record
| align="center" style="border-style: none none solid solid; background: #e3e3e3"|Opponent
| align="center" style="border-style: none none solid solid; background: #e3e3e3"|Type
| align="center" style="border-style: none none solid solid; background: #e3e3e3"|Round
| align="center" style="border-style: none none solid solid; background: #e3e3e3"|Date
| align="center" style="border-style: none none solid solid; background: #e3e3e3"|Location
| align="center" style="border-style: none none solid solid; background: #e3e3e3"|Notes
|-align=center
|Win
|
|align=left| Volodymyr Afanasiev
|TKO
|2
|18/03/2011
|align=left| Yenakiyevo, Ukraine
|align=left|
|-
|Win
|
|align=left| Vitali Shkraba
|TKO
|4
|21/08/2007
|align=left| Donetsk, Ukraine
|align=left|
|-
|Loss
|
|align=left| Vincenzo Cantatore
|MD
|12
|22/06/2007
|align=left| Rome, Italy
|align=left|
|-
|Win
|
|align=left| Shaun George
|UD
|12
|23/02/2007
|align=left| Ekaterinburg, Russia
|align=left|
|-
|Loss
|
|align=left| David Haye
|KO
|1
|16/12/2005
|align=left| Bracknell, Berkshire, England
|align=left|
|-
|Win
|
|align=left| Marcelo Ferreira dos Santos
|TKO
|2
|14/05/2005
|align=left| Kyiv, Ukraine
|align=left|
|-
|Win
|
|align=left| Allan "Macho Man" Gronfors
|KO
|1
|24/02/2005
|align=left| Kyiv, Ukraine
|align=left|
|-
|Win
|
|align=left| Volodymyr Savkov
|KO
|2
|13/02/2005
|align=left| Kyiv, Ukraine
|align=left|
|-
|Win
|
|align=left| Vincenzo Rossitto
|TKO
|2
|27/11/2004
|align=left| Genoa, Italy
|align=left|
|-
|Win
|
|align=left| Konstiantyn Pryziuk
|TKO
|4
|24/10/2004
|align=left| Chernihiv, Ukraine
|align=left|
|-
|Win
|
|align=left| Ivan Dubin
|KO
|6
|29/05/2003
|align=left| Mariupol, Ukraine
|align=left|
|-
|Loss
|
|align=left| Jean-Marc Mormeck
|TKO
|8
|01/03/2003
|align=left| Las Vegas, Nevada, U.S.
|align=left|
|-
|Win
|
|align=left| Patrick Madzinga
|TKO
|1
|23/03/2002
|align=left| Kyiv, Ukraine
|align=left|
|-
|Win
|
|align=left| Ruediger May
|TKO
|4
|01/12/2001
|align=left| Dortmund, Germany
|align=left|
|-
|Win
|
|align=left| Torsten May
|TKO
|8
|21/04/2001
|align=left| Erfurt, Germany
|align=left|
|-
|Win
|
|align=left| Yuriy Yelistratov
|KO
|7
|27/01/2001
|align=left| Mykolaiv, Ukraine
|align=left|
|-
|Win
|
|align=left| Larry Prather
|TKO
|5
|17/06/2000
|align=left| Mariupol, Ukraine
|align=left|
|-
|Win
|
|align=left| Kostiantyn Okhrey
|TKO
|6
|21/01/2000
|align=left| Kyiv, Ukraine
|align=left|
|-
|Win
|
|align=left| Badara "Black Thunder" M'baye
|TKO
|8
|26/11/1999
|align=left| Marseille, France
|align=left|
|-
|Win
|
|align=left| Mykola Bairak
|KO
|3
|23/06/1999
|align=left| Zhytomyr, Ukraine
|align=left|
|-
|Win
|
|align=left| Isaac Mahlangu
|KO
|4
|21/05/1999
|align=left| Kyiv, Ukraine
|align=left|
|-
|Win
|
|align=left| Oleh Mishchenko
|KO
|2
|23/02/1999
|align=left| Kirovohrad, Ukraine
|align=left|
|-
|Win
|
|align=left| Vadim Anikeev
|KO
|2
|30/01/1999
|align=left| Dniprodzerzhynsk, Ukraine
|align=left|
|-
|Win
|
|align=left| Viktor Sidorenko
|KO
|2
|26/06/1998
|align=left| Dnipropetrovsk, Ukraine
|align=left|
|-
|Loss
|
|align=left| Terry Dunstan
|KO
|1
|14/02/1998
|align=left| London, England
|align=left|
|-
|Win
|
|align=left| Trevor Small
|KO
|6
|25/10/1997
|align=left| Queensferry, Wales
|align=left|
|-
|Win
|
|align=left| Parshin
|KO
|2
|03/05/1997
|align=left| Mariupol, Ukraine
|align=left|
|-
|Loss
|
|align=left| Nate Miller
|TKO
|2
|22/02/1997
|align=left| Fort Lauderdale, Florida, U.S.
|align=left|
|-
|Win
|
|align=left| Willie Lee Kemp
|PTS
|6
|10/08/1996
|align=left| St. Pauli, Germany
|align=left|
|-
|Win
|
|align=left| Pedro Daniel Franco
|TKO
|3
|20/04/1996
|align=left| Levallois-Perret, France
|align=left|
|-
|Win
|
|align=left| Patrice Aouissi
|KO
|5
|24/10/1995
|align=left| Levallois-Perret, France
|align=left|
|-
|Win
|
|align=left| Krishna Wainwright
|TKO
|3
|27/06/1995
|align=left| Levallois-Perret, France
|align=left|
|-
|Loss
|
|align=left| Patrice Aouissi
|KO
|3
|14/03/1995
|align=left| Levallois-Perret, France
|align=left|
|-
|Win
|
|align=left| Norbert Ekassi
|TKO
|1
|17/01/1995
|align=left| Levallois-Perret, France
|align=left|
|-
|Win
|
|align=left| Serhiy Dotsenko
|KO
|5
|09/12/1994
|align=left| Mariupol, Ukraine
|align=left|
|-
|Win
|
|align=left| Oleksiy Hovorov
|PTS
|8
|09/10/1994
|align=left| Artemivsk, Ukraine
|align=left|
|-
|Win
|
|align=left| Tzvetan Tzvetkov
|KO
|3
|10/09/1994
|align=left| Torez, Ukraine
|align=left|
|-
|Win
|
|align=left| Ivan Honcharov
|KO
|6
|28/08/1994
|align=left| Rubizhne, Ukraine
|align=left|
|-
|Win
|
|align=left| Eugene Taima
|KO
|1
|07/05/1994
|align=left| Dnipropetrovsk, Ukraine
|align=left|
|-
|Win
|
|align=left| Sylvester White
|PTS
|8
|26/02/1994
|align=left| Vilvoorde, Belgium
|align=left|
|-
|Win
|
|align=left| Andrey Rudenko
|KO
|2
|30/01/1994
|align=left| Makiyivka, Ukraine
|align=left|
|-
|Win
|
|align=left| Valery Denisenko
|PTS
|8
|25/12/1993
|align=left| Mykolaiv, Ukraine
|align=left|
|-
|Draw
|
|align=left| Valeriy Vykhor
|PTS
|8
|24/10/1993
|align=left| Sevastopol, Ukraine
|align=left|
|-
|Win
|
|align=left| Volodymyr Vovk
|KO
|5
|03/10/1993
|align=left| Oleksandriya, Ukraine
|align=left|
|-
|Win
|
|align=left| Vitaly Yarovoy
|KO
|8
|18/07/1993
|align=left| Kryvyi Rih, Ukraine
|align=left|
|-
|Win
|
|align=left| Mykola Dobretskyi
|KO
|3
|08/05/1993
|align=left| Yalta, Ukraine
|align=left|
|-
|Win
|
|align=left| Ihor Haluza
|PTS
|8
|17/04/1993
|align=left| Kryvyi Rih, Ukraine
|align=left|
|-
|Win
|
|align=left| Serhiy Kryvonis
|KO
|4
|27/03/1993
|align=left| Mariupol, Ukraine
|align=left|
|}

External links
 

1971 births
Living people
Ukrainian male boxers
Cruiserweight boxers
Sportspeople from Mariupol